In physics and fluid mechanics, a Blasius boundary layer (named after Paul Richard Heinrich Blasius) describes the steady two-dimensional laminar boundary layer that forms on a semi-infinite plate which is held parallel to a constant unidirectional flow. Falkner and Skan later generalized Blasius' solution to wedge flow (Falkner–Skan boundary layer), i.e. flows in which the plate is not parallel to the flow.

Prandtl's boundary layer equations

Using scaling arguments, Ludwig Prandtl argued that about half of the terms in the Navier-Stokes equations are negligible in boundary layer flows (except in a small region near the leading edge of the plate). This leads to a reduced set of equations known as the boundary layer equations. For steady incompressible flow with constant viscosity and density, these read:

Mass Continuity: 

-Momentum: 

-Momentum: 

A number of similarity solutions to this set of equations have been found for various types of flow, including flow on a thin flat-plate. The term similarity refers to the property that the velocity profiles at different positions in the flow are the same apart from scaling factors. Similarity scaling factors reduce the set of partial differential equations to a relatively easily solved set of non-linear ordinary differential equations. Paul Richard Heinrich Blasius, one of Prandtl's students, developed the similarity model corresponding to the flow for the case where the pressure gradient, /, along a thin flat-plate is negligible compared to any pressure gradient in the boundary layer region.

Blasius equation - first-order boundary layer

Blasius showed that for the case where , the Prandtl -momentum equation has a self-similar solution. The self-similar solution exists because the equations and the boundary conditions are invariant under the transformation

where  is any positive constant. He introduced the self-similar variables

The stream function is directly proportional to the normalized function, which is only a function of the similarity thickness variable. This leads directly to the velocity components:

Substitution into the -momentum equation gives the Blasius equation

The boundary conditions are the no-slip condition, the impermeability of the wall and the free stream velocity outside the boundary layer

This is a third-order non-linear ordinary differential equation which can be solved numerically, e.g. with the shooting method.

where  is the Blasius displacement thickness.

The Blasius normal velocity  and the -pressure gradient asymptotes to a value of 0.86 and 0.43, respectively, at large -values whereas  asymptotes to the free stream velocity .  As  goes to zero, the scaled -pressure gradient goes to 0.16603.

The limiting form for small  is

and the limiting form for large  is

The characteristic parameters for boundary layers are the two sigma viscous boundary layer thickness, the displacement thickness , the momentum thickness , the wall shear stress  and the drag force  acting on a length  of the plate.  For the Blasius solution, they are given by

The factor  in the drag force formula is to account both sides of the plate.

The Von Kármán Momentum integral and the energy integral for Blasius profile reduce to

Uniqueness of Blasius solution
The Blasius solution is not unique from a mathematical perspective, as Ludwig Prandtl himself noted it in his transposition theorem and analyzed by series of researchers such as Keith Stewartson, Paul A. Libby. To this solution, any one of the infinite discrete set of eigenfunctions can be added, each of which satisfies the linearly perturbed equation with homogeneous conditions and exponential decay at infinity. The first of these eigenfunctions turns out to be the  derivative of the first order Blasius solution, which represents the uncertainty in the effective location of the origin.

Second-order boundary layer
This boundary layer approximation predicts a non-zero vertical velocity far away from the wall, which needs to be accounted in next order outer inviscid layer and the corresponding inner boundary layer solution, which in turn will predict a new vertical velocity and so on. The vertical velocity at infinity for the first order boundary layer problem from the Blasius equation is

The solution for second order boundary layer is zero. The solution for outer inviscid and inner boundary layer are

Again as in the first order boundary problem, any one of the infinite set of eigensolution can be added to this solution. In all the solutions  can be considered as a Reynolds number.

Third-order boundary layer

Since the second order inner problem is zero, the corresponding corrections to third order problem is null i.e., the third order outer problem is same as second order outer problem. The solution for third-order correction does not have an exact expression, but the inner boundary layer expansion is of the form,

Blasius boundary layer with suction
Suction is one of the common methods to postpone the boundary layer separation. Consider a uniform suction velocity at the wall .  Bryan Thwaites showed that the solution for this problem is same as the Blasius solution without suction for distances very close to the leading edge. Introducing the transformation

into the boundary layer equations leads to

with boundary conditions,

Von Mises transformation

Iglisch obtained the complete numerical solution in 1944. If further von Mises transformation is introduced

then the equations become

with boundary conditions,

This parabolic partial differential equation can be marched starting from  numerically.

Asymptotic suction profile

Since the convection due to suction and the diffusion due to the solid wall are acting in the opposite direction, the profile will reach steady solution at large distance, unlike the Blasius profile where boundary layer grows indefinitely. The solution was first obtained by Griffith and F.W. Meredith. For  distances from the leading edge of the plate , both the boundary layer thickness and the solution are independent of  given by

Stewartson studied matching of full solution to the asymptotic suction profile.

Compressible Blasius boundary layer

Here Blasius boundary layer with a specified specific enthalpy  at the wall is studied. The density , viscosity  and thermal conductivity  are no longer constant here. The equation for conservation of mass, momentum and energy become

where  is the Prandtl number with suffix  representing properties evaluated at infinity. The boundary conditions become

,
.

Unlike the incompressible boundary layer, similarity solution exists only if the transformation

holds and this is possible only if .

Howarth transformation

Introducing the self-similar variables using Howarth–Dorodnitsyn transformation

the equations reduce to

The equation can be solved once  are specified. The boundary conditions are

If  is constant, then . The temperature inside the boundary layer will increase even though the plate temperature is maintained at the same temperature as ambient, due to dissipative heating and of course, these dissipation effects are only pronounced when the Mach number  is large.

First-order Blasius boundary layer in parabolic coordinates

Since the boundary layer equations are Parabolic partial differential equation, the natural coordinates for the problem is parabolic coordinates. The transformation from Cartesian coordinates  to parabolic coordinates  is given by

.

See also

Falkner–Skan boundary layer
Emmons problem

External links
  - English translation of Blasius' original paper - NACA Technical Memorandum 1256.

Footnotes

References

 
 
Wilcox, David C. Basic Fluid Mechanics DCW Industries Inc. 2007

Boundary layers
Fluid dynamics